The 2021 North Texas Mean Green football team represented the University of North Texas during the 2021 NCAA Division I FBS football season. The Mean Green played their home games at Apogee Stadium in Denton, Texas, and competed in the West Division of Conference USA (C-USA).

The Mean Green started the season 1–6 before winning five games in a row, including upset victories over UTEP and then-undefeated #22 UTSA, to finish the regular season at 6–6, 5–3 in C-USA play. The team was invited to the inaugural Frisco Football Classic, losing 14–27 to the Miami RedHawks.

Previous season

The 2020 team finished the regular season with a record of 4–5, 3–4 in Conference USA play, finishing in fourth place in the West Division. The team was invited to the Myrtle Beach Bowl, losing 28–56 to Appalachian State. Defensive coordinator Clint Bowen was fired on January 1, 2021 after just one season, with the defense allowing an average of 42.8 points per game. Bowen was replaced by Phil Bennett.

Preseason

C-USA media days
The Mean Green were predicted to finish in sixth place in the West Division in the Conference USA preseason poll.

Schedule

Personnel

Game summaries

Northwestern State

at SMU

UAB

at Louisiana Tech

at Missouri

Marshall

Liberty

at Rice

at Southern Miss

UTEP

at FIU

No. 22 UTSA

vs. Miami (OH) (Frisco Football Classic)

References

North Texas
North Texas Mean Green football seasons
North Texas Mean Green football